E141 may refer to :
 The E number for chlorophyllin
 Praga E-141, a military trainer aircraft produced in Czechoslovakia during the 1930s